Željko Samardžić (Cyrillic: Жељко Самарџић; born 3 October 1955) is a [Bosnian Serb Orthodox Christian] folk singer born in Mostar, Bosnia and Herzegovina popular throughout the former Yugoslav republics. He achieved fame when he moved to Belgrade as a result of the Bosnian War.

Biography
Samardžić was born in Mostar, at the time part of PR Bosnia and Herzegovina, in FPR Yugoslavia. His father Milivoje was an ethnic  Montenegrin from Montenegro, and his mother Nada was a Herzegovinian from the Ilići suburb of Mostar. Samardžić's father was a Yugoslav People's Army officer, which meant that the family had to move around a lot. After spending the first seven years of his life in Mostar, young Željko lived and attended school in Nikšić, Igalo and Zadar before eventually returning to Mostar during his teenage years.

He first started singing during high school, and soon became known around Mostar as a good Kemal Monteno impersonator. Samardžić's musical activity during this period was essentially little more than a hobby as he did not put out any official releases and mostly sang in kafanas and restaurants in addition to competing in the occasional obscure festival. The closest he came to wide mainstream success was a schlager "Moja Marija je drugačija" that became a hit in Bosnia during the 1970s after he performed it at Prvi aplauz festival in Banja Luka, but he mostly earned his living running a café in Mostar, located in proximity of the famous Old Bridge.

When the Bosnian War broke out in 1992, Željko was wounded sitting in his apartment while chaotic fighting was raging outside. A stray bullet entered his leg and exited his hip. After much trouble, along with his wife and their daughter, he managed to flee the city through the Croat-controlled western part of Herzegovina and eventually reach Serbia after going through Croatia, Slovenia and Hungary. Once in Serbia, they lived in the Belgrade suburb of Borča and Samardžić soon started getting low-paying gigs in various discothèques and cafés, building up a fairly devoted niche audience. Almost 40 years old at this point, his big break came unexpectedly when some businessmen who enjoyed his nightclub performances brought him to the elite club Ambassador and also financed him with DM30,000 to record an album with Marina Tucaković and Aleksandar "Futa" Radulović. In 1995, he also appeared at the Pjesma Mediterana festival in Budva, where he left a great impression singing "Sipajte mi još jedan viski", which further opened the doors to show business.

Personal life
He is married to Maja Džaferović, an ethnic Bosniak, with whom he has daughters Sanja, Danijela and Minja, and grandchildren Luka, Aleksa and Nina.

Discography

Studio albums
Jednom kad nam dođu sijede (1987)
Želja (1990)
Oko tvoje neverno (1993)
Sudbina (1995)
Sećanje na ljubav (1996)
Zveket srca (1997)
Sve je moje tvoje (1999)
Sentimentalan čovek (2001)
Pokaži mi šta znaš (2004)
Lice ljubavi (2006)
Kojim dobrom mila moja (2009)
Mila (2017)

References

External links
 Official website
 Publika me održava u životu, Blic, 8 March 2008
 Koncert Željka Samardžića – 'Ljubavna adresa' bila je Zetra, Sarajevo-x.com, 31 October 2009

Living people
1955 births
Musicians from Mostar
Bosnia and Herzegovina pop singers
20th-century Serbian male singers
Yugoslav Wars refugees
Bosnia and Herzegovina emigrants to Serbia
Refugees in Serbia
Indexi Award winners
Bosnia and Herzegovina people of Croatian descent 
Bosnia and Herzegovina people of Montenegrin descent
20th-century Bosnia and Herzegovina male singers
Beovizija contestants